The Giardino botanico Clelia Durazzo Grimaldi is a small botanical garden located on the grounds of the Villa Durazzo-Pallavicini in Pegli, a suburb of Genoa, Italy. It is a part of the romantic historical park made by Ignazio Pallavicini in 1846.

The garden was established in 1794 by Clelia Durazzo Grimaldi, and donated to the city in 1928. Today is restored and it contains around twenty groups of plants laid on the ground by an educational disposition:

 Carnivorous plants
 Succulent plants
 Tropical plants and orchids
 Palms
 Ferns
 Camellias
 Roses
 Bamboo
 Aquatic plants
 Mediterranean plants
 Scented plants
 Useful plants

The garden contains a lot of species, some of these rare or unusual.

See also 
 List of botanical gardens in Italy

External links and references
 Il giardino botanico Clelia Durazzo Grimaldi   from the Istituto Tecnologie Didattiche website.
 Convention on Biological Diversity — Botanic Gardens in Italy

Botanical gardens in Italy
1794 establishments in the Republic of Genoa
Tourist attractions in Genoa
Gardens in Liguria